The Dzata Ruins (or Dzana ruins), an archaeological site in Dzanani in the Makhado municipality, Vhembe district, in the north of South Africa, is one of the national monuments in South Africa.

Scholars who have made a study of the various legends and traditions associated with the ruins, find it clear that they are many contradictions.  Archaeological evidence has shed some lights on these events, but a great deal of work still remains to be done. It is certain that Dzata was built at an earlier date than many people are willing to admit . Radiocarbon dates suggest a beginning shortly after AD 1700, with an end some 50 to 60 years later. 

Documentary proof of this is found in Dutch records, which refer to an interview in 1730 with an African by the name of Mahumane, who had visited the kingdom of Thovhele some five years previously. Mahumane described a settlement built of dark-blue stone, with a wall enclosing the whole area. He also mentioned that the chief cities are made of the same stone. To date no stone-walled settlement has been found that is made of dark blue stone, other than Dzata. There is no doubt that Dzata was the capital of united Venda.

It is not clear what the role of the legendary Thohoyandou was at this stage. It is highly unlikely that he could remain chief throughout this period of a minimum of 50 years that Dzata was the capital. Oral history indicates very strongly that it was after the disappearance of Thohoyandou that Dzata was abandoned, and the Venda nation fragmented once more into independent chiefdoms. It seems very likely that Thohoyandou expanded the Venda empire to cover areas as far south as the Olifants River near Phalaborwa. No doubt trade played an important role in this.

See also
Other ruins in South Africa
Blaauboschkraal stone ruins in Mpumalanga
Machadodorp baKoni Ruins in Mpumalanga
Kaditshwene in North West province
Kweneng' Ruins in Gauteng
Mapungubwe in Limpopo
Sedan Beehive stone huts in Free State
Tlokwe Ruins in Gauteng
Similar ruins outside South Africa
Bumbusi in Zimbabwe
Danangombe in Zimbabwe
Engaruka in Arusha Region, Tanzania
Khami in Zimbabwe
Leopard's Kopje
Manyikeni – in Mozambique
Naletale in Zimbabwe
Thimlich Ohinga stone ruins in Migori County, Kenya
Ziwa in Zimbabwe
Venda

References

External links

 Museum of the Drum and Dzata Ruins
 Dzata - Luonde Thavhakhulu dzi a Rendana
 

Archaeological sites in South Africa
Buildings and structures in Limpopo
Former populated places in South Africa
Ruins in South Africa
Archaeological sites of Southern Africa